Harry Todd (December 13, 1863 – February 15, 1935) was an American actor. 

He appeared in nearly 400 films between 1909 and 1935. On Broadway, Todd was a member of the ensemble in The American Way (1939).

Todd died in Glendale, California, from a heart attack at the age of 71. He was married to actress Margaret Joslin.

Selected filmography

 Ben's Kid (1909, Short)
 Across the Plains (1911, Short)
 Alkali Ike's Auto (1911, Short) - Mustang Pete
 The Infant at Snakeville (1911)
 Luke Pipes the Pippins (1916, Short)
 Luke's Late Lunchers (1916, Short)
 Luke Laughs Last (1916, Short)
 Luke's Fatal Flivver (1916, Short)
 Luke, Crystal Gazer (1916, Short)
 Luke's Lost Lamb (1916, Short)
 Luke Does the Midway (1916, Short)
 Luke Joins the Navy (1916, Short)
 Luke and the Mermaids (1916, Short)
 Luke's Speedy Club Life (1916, Short)
 Luke and the Bang-Tails (1916, Short)
 Luke, the Chauffeur (1916, Short)
 Luke's Preparedness Preparations (1916, Short)
 Luke, the Gladiator (1916, Short)
 Luke, Patient Provider (1916, Short)
 Luke's Newsie Knockout (1916, Short)
 Luke's Movie Muddle (1916, Short)
 Luke, Rank Impersonator (1916, Short)
 Luke's Shattered Sleep (1916, Short)
 It Can't Be True! (1916, Short) 
 Lonesome Luke on Tin Can Alley (1917, Short)
 Lonesome Luke Loses Patients (1917, Short)
 We Never Sleep (1917, Short)
 Shootin' Mad (1918)
 She Hired a Husband (1918) - Jerry Grogan
 The Son-of-a-Gun (1919) - Sheriff (uncredited)
 A Taste of Life (1919) - Detective
 A Favor To A Friend (1919) - William Z. Williams
 The Face in the Watch (1919, Short)
 Please Get Married (1919) - Mr. John Harper Ashley
 Her Elephant Man (1920) - Jerimy
 The Jack-Knife Man (1920) - 'Booge'
 Fickle Women (1920) - William Price
 Girls Don't Gamble (1920) - Wilbur Rathbone
 Patsy (1921)- Tramp
 The Sky Pilot (1921) - The Old Timer
 Keeping Up with Lizzie (1921) - Mr. Pettigrew
 Play Square (1921) - Betty's Father
 Penrod (1922) - (uncredited)
 According to Hoyle (1922) - Jim Riggs
 Bells of San Juan (1922) - John Engel
 Conquering the Woman (1922) - Sandy MacTavish
 The Danger Point (1922) - Sam Biggs
 What a Wife Learned (1923) - Tracy McGrath
 Three Jumps Ahead (1923) - Lige McLean
 The Barefoot Boy (1923) - Bill Hawkins
 Tea: With a Kick! (1923) - Chris Kringle
 Treasure Canyon (1924)
 Ride for Your Life (1924) - 'Plug' Hanks
 The Lone Chance (1924) - Burke
 A Self-Made Failure (1924) - The Constable
 The Sawdust Trail (1924) - Quid Jackson
 Horseshoe Luck (1924)
 Thundering Romance (1924) - Davey Jones
 Full Speed (1925)
 The Hurricane Kid (1925) - Hezekial Potts
 Quicker'n Lightnin''' (1925) - Al McNutt
 The Outlaw's Daughter (1925) - Bookkeeper
 The Desert Demon (1925) - Snitz Doolittle
 Lorraine of the Lions (1925) - Colby
 Daring Days (1925) - Hank Skinner
 The Saddle Cyclone (1925) - Andy Simms
 Two-Fisted Jones (1925) - Bart Wilson
 Under Western Skies (1926) - Payne
 Coming an' Going (1926) - Andy Simms
 Chip of the Flying U (1926) - Weary
 The Flaming Frontier (1926) - California Joe
 Rawhide (1926) - Two Gun
 The Bonanza Buckaroo (1926) - Chewin' Charlie
 The Runaway Express (1926) - Dad Hamilton
 The Buckaroo Kid (1926) - Tom Darby
 Forest Havoc (1926)
 Prisoners of the Storm (1926) - Pete Le Grande
 The Third Degree (1926) - Mr. Chubb
 A One Man Game (1927) - Sam Baker
 The Ridin' Rowdy (1927) - Deefy
 Whispering Smith Rides (1927) - Train Engineer (uncredited)
 Skedaddle Gold (1927) - Rusty
 The Bugle Call (1927) - Cpl. Jansen
 White Pebbles (1927) - Tim
 The Interferin' Gent (1927) - Buddy
 The Obligin' Buckaroo (1927) - Bozo Muldoon
 Roarin' Broncs (1927)
 The Rawhide Kid (1928) - Comic
 Under the Tonto Rim (1928) - Bert
 The Flyin' Cowboy (1928) - Tom Gordon
 The River Woman (1928) - The Scrub
 The Pace That Kills (1928) - Uncle Caleb
 King of the Rodeo (1929) - J.G
 One Stolen Night (1929) - Blazer
 The King of the Kongo (1929) - Commodore
 Courtin' Wildcats (1929) - McKenzie
 Lucky Larkin (1930) - Bill Parkinson
 The Last Dance (1930) - Pa Kelly
 The Fighting Legion (1930) - Dad Williams
 Sons of the Saddle (1930) - 'Pop' Higgins
 Borrowed Wives (1930) - Lawyer Winstead
 Under Montana Skies (1930) - Abner Jenkins
 Ten Cents a Dance (1931) - Mr. Carney
 Ten Nights in a Barroom (1931) - Sample
 The Sign of the Wolf (1931) - John Farnum
 The Texas Ranger (1931) - Lynn Oldring - Clayton Rider
 In Old Cheyenne (1931) - Ben Stevens
 The Miracle Woman (1931) - Briggs (uncredited)
 Law of the Rio Grande (1931) - Cookie
 Branded (1931) - Robbed Stage Passenger (uncredited)
 Shotgun Pass (1931) - Sheriff Pete
 The Fighting Marshal (1931) - Pop
 The Deadline (1931) - Chloride
 Forbidden (1932) - (uncredited)
 One Man Law (1932) - Deputy Hank
 The Fighting Fool (1932) - Deputy Hoppy
 The Lone Trail (1932) - John Farnum
 Shopworn (1932) - Henry - The Counterman (uncredited)
 American Madness (1932) - Tom Gardner (uncredited)
 Fighting for Justice (1932) - Cookie
 Gold (1932) - Prospector (uncredited)
 White Eagle (1932) - Sam (uncredited)
 The Wyoming Whirlwind (1932) - Sheriff Joe Flagg
 Sundown Rider (1932) - Mulligan
 Her Splendid Folly (1933) - Witness
 Sucker Money (1933) - Harry (uncredited)
 Phantom Thunderbolt (1933) - Townsman (uncredited)
 Gun Law (1933) - Blackjack
 The Thrill Hunter (1933) - Station Agent
 Unknown Valley (1933) - Zeke (uncredited)
 Trouble Busters (1933) - Skinny Cassidy
 Gordon of Ghost City (1933, Serial) - Salesman (Ch. 4) (uncredited)
 Hold the Press (1933) - Press Room Foreman (uncredited)
 It Happened One Night (1934) - Flagman at Railroad Crossing (uncredited)
 David Harum (1934) - Elmer (uncredited)
 One Is Guilty (1934) - Danny O'Keefe
 The Prescott Kid (1934) - Dr. Lemuel Haley
 Broadway Bill (1934) - Pop Jones
 Westerner (1934) - Uncle Ben
 Lottery Lover (1935) - Hayseed (uncredited)
 Law Beyond the Range (1935) - Judge Avery
 Vagabond Lady'' (1935) - Crabby Clerk (uncredited)

References

External links

1863 births
1935 deaths
American male silent film actors
American male film actors
Male actors from Pennsylvania
Male actors from Glendale, California
Male actors from Pittsburgh
20th-century American male actors
Male Western (genre) film actors
Broadway theatre people
American male stage actors